Lucinda is an unincorporated community in Clarion County, Pennsylvania, United States. Lucinda has a post office with ZIP code 16235, which opened on January 15, 1840.

Notable person
 Barney Lutz, professional baseball player, manager, and scout

References

Unincorporated communities in Clarion County, Pennsylvania
Unincorporated communities in Pennsylvania